Tha Kilen railway station is a railway station located in Sing Subdistrict, Sai Yok District, Kanchanaburi Province. It is located near the Mueang Sing Historical Park.

Tha Kilen (also: Takalin) was a Japanese prisoner of war work camp during World War II. The camp was initially used for the construction of the Burma Railway, and was located 98 kilometres from Nong Pladuk.  The first prisoners arrived in February 1943. Prisoners returned in April 1945 for maintenance work. On 7 April 1945, 8 were killed during an allied bombardment, because they were not allowed to take shelter by the Japanese guards.

References 

Railway stations in Thailand
Kanchanaburi province
Burma Railway